Puberty Blues is an Australian television drama. It premiered on the Network Ten on 15 August 2012. The show focuses on the lives of two teen girls dealing with their lives in the 1970s. In October 2012, Ten renewed  Puberty Blues for a second season, which began airing on 5 March 2014.

Series overview

Episodes

Season 1 (2012)

Season 2 (2014)

References

External links
 

Lists of Australian drama television series episodes
2012 Australian television seasons
2014 Australian television seasons